Diana L. Eck (born 1945 in Bozeman, Montana) is a scholar of religious studies who is Professor of Comparative Religion and Indian Studies at Harvard University, as well as a former faculty dean of Lowell House and the Director of The Pluralism Project at Harvard. Among other works, she is the author of Banaras, City of Light, Darsan: Seeing the Divine Image in India, Encountering God: A Spiritual Journey from Bozeman to Banaras, and A New Religious America: How a Christian Country Became the World's Most Religiously Diverse Nation.  At Harvard, she is in the Department of Sanskrit and Indian Studies, the Committee on the Study of Religion, and is also a member of the Faculty of Divinity. She has been reappointed the chair for the Committee on the Study of Religion, a position which she held from 1990 to 1998. In March 2012, Diana authored her book India: A Sacred Geography. She also served on the Humanities jury for the Infosys Prize in 2019.

Biography 
Raised as a Christian Methodist in Montana, Eck later embraced Hindu, Muslim and Buddhist beliefs about spirituality and now she describes her religious ideals as "interfaith" infrastructures. She has been connected with the World Council of Churches, and Harvard Divinity School.

Eck's mother, Dorothy Eck, was a Montana State Senator for twenty years, president of the Montana League of Women Voters, and a delegate to Montana's 1972 Constitutional Convention.

Education 
Eck received her B.A. in Religious Studies from Smith College in 1967, and her M.A. in Indian  History from The School of Oriental and African Studies, University of London in 1968. In 1976 she received her Ph.D. from Harvard University in the Comparative Study of Religion.

Interest in other religions 
Since 1991, Diana Eck has also turned her attention to the United States and has been heading a research team at Harvard University to explore the new religious diversity of the United States and its meaning for the American pluralist experiment. The Pluralism Project has developed an affiliation with many other colleges and universities across the country and around the world. In 1994, Diana Eck and the Pluralism Project published "World Religions in Boston, A Guide to Communities and Resources" which introduces the many religious traditions and communities in Boston, Massachusetts - from Native Americans, Christians, Jews, Muslims, Buddhists, Hindus, Sikhs, Jains, to Zoroastrians. In 1997, Diana Eck and the Pluralism Project published an educational multimedia CD Rom, On Common Ground: World Religions in America (Columbia University Press). This CD Rom received awards from Media & Methods, EdPress, and Educom.

In 2001, her book A New Religious America: How a “Christian Country” Has Become the World’s Most Religiously Diverse Nation was published. It deals with religious diversity in the United States since 1965.

Eck is married to the Reverend Dorothy Austin. The two joined in matrimony on July 4, 2004, after 28 years together.

Concept of Pluralism
Eck's interest in other religions combined with her own ‘Christian pluralist’ faith led her to develop her concept of pluralism. Pluralism, for Eck, is the best response to the challenges of religious diversity. The term pluralism has been understood in numerous ways but Eck is clear to distinguish between pluralism and plurality  - two words which are often used interchangeably and without distinction. Whilst plurality is the fact of diversity, pluralism is a response to that diversity – and in Eck's account, it is an active, positive response.

Eck lays out three prevalent responses to religious diversity: exclusivism, inclusivism and pluralism. An exclusivist approach takes the position that “my way is the only way”. An inclusivist might consider that there are grains of truth in other ways, but ultimately understands that “my way is the better way”. In contrast, a pluralist response seeks to find new ways of positively engaging with diversity, exploring differences whilst seeking common understanding. On the website for Harvard University's Pluralism Project, Eck describes the four principles of pluralism:
 Pluralism is not diversity alone, but the energetic engagement with diversity
 Pluralism is not tolerance, but the active seeking of understanding across lines of difference
 Pluralism is not relativism, but the encounter of commitments
 Pluralism is based on dialogue.

Eck's concept of pluralism has been influential within the wider interfaith movement, and is cited by the Interfaith Youth Core as foundational to its organisational values.

First LGBT Master at Harvard
In 1998, Eck and Dorothy Austin became the first same-sex couple to be masters (now called faculty deans) of Lowell House, one of the twelve undergraduate residences at Harvard.

Awards 
In 1995, Eck was the recipient of the University of Louisville and Louisville Presbyterian Theological Seminary Grawemeyer Award in Religion.

In 1996, Prof. Eck was appointed to a U.S. State Department Advisory Committee on Religious Freedom Abroad, a twenty-member commission charged with advising the Secretary of State on enhancing and protecting religious freedom in the overall context of human rights.

In 1998, President Bill Clinton and the National Endowment for the Humanities awarded her the National Humanities Medal for her work on religious pluralism in the United States.

In 2002, Diana Eck received the Martin Marty Award for the Public Understanding of Religion from the American Academy of Religion

In 2003, Diana Eck received the Montana Humanities Award from the Governor of Montana

In 2007, Professor Eck was made a lifetime member of the Girl Scouts of the USA

In 2013, Diana Eck was elected an Honorary Fellow by the Governing Body on the recommendation of the Academic Board of her alma mater,  SOAS, University of London

Books 
  (14 pages)
 
 
Reprinted as: 
 
  (Kathryn Fraser Mackay lecture, 1985: 16 pages)
 
 
Won the Unitarian Universalist Melcher Award (1994) and the Grawemeyer Book Award (1995).
  Multimedia presentation on CD ROM.

References

External links
 Bio & Curriculum vitae 

1945 births
Living people
American theologians
LGBT Methodists
American lesbian writers
Smith College alumni
Alumni of SOAS University of London
Harvard University alumni
Writers from Bozeman, Montana
National Humanities Medal recipients
American Indologists
Presidents of the American Academy of Religion
Women religious writers
American United Methodists
LGBT people from Montana